NGC 4230 is a loosely scattered open cluster in the constellation of Centaurus. It was discovered by John Herschel on April 5, 1837.

The ESO catalog (and SIMBAD database) misidentify ESO 171-SC14 as NGC 4230.

See also 
 Open cluster 
 List of NGC objects (4001–5000)
 Centaurus (constellation)

References

External links 
 
 SEDS

Open clusters
Centaurus (constellation)
4230
Astronomical objects discovered in 1837
Discoveries by John Herschel